Brautsee is a lake in Schleswig, Schleswig-Holstein, Germany. At an elevation of 12 m, its surface area is 7.2 ha.

Lakes of Schleswig-Holstein
Schleswig, Schleswig-Holstein